Golf is a commuter railroad station on Metra's Milwaukee District North Line in Golf, Illinois. It serves commuters between Union Station and Fox Lake, Illinois, and in Metra's zone-based fare system, Golf is in zone D. As of 2018, Golf is the 133rd busiest of Metra's 236 non-downtown stations, with an average of 355 weekday boardings. The station also houses the Golf Police Department.

As of December 5, 2022, Golf is served by 40 trains (19 inbound, 21 outbound) on weekdays, by all 20 trains (10 in each direction) on Saturdays, and by all 18 trains (nine in each direction) on Sundays and holidays.

Golf station was originally built in 1903 by the Chicago, Milwaukee, St. Paul and Pacific Railroad. Parking is available south of Overlook Drive and Briar Road, near Deideich Park.

Bus connections
Pace

208 Golf Road (2 blocks south of Overlook Drive)
210 Lincoln Avenue

References

External links

Station from Briar Road from Google Maps Street View

Metra stations in Illinois
Former Chicago, Milwaukee, St. Paul and Pacific Railroad stations
Railway stations in the United States opened in 1903
Railway stations in Cook County, Illinois